Jerry Prempeh (born 29 December 1988 in Kumasi) is a Ghanaian footballer. He currently plays for Swift Hesperange.

Career
Prempeh began his career with Le Mée Sports Football and signed with Troyes AC in 2003. He made five senior caps for Troyes AC and was released in summer 2009, to sign for FK Mlada Boleslav. In November 2009 resign his contract with FK Mlada Boleslav and signed with US Sénart-Moissy. After one season left on 23 June 2010 his club US Sénart-Moissy and signed with R.E. Virton. After just one season left R.E. Virton and joined to Swiss lower League club FC Fribourg.

International career
He also holds French citizenship.

References

External links
 
 hattrick.ch - Agenda
 

1988 births
Living people
ES Troyes AC players
Ghanaian footballers
Ghanaian expatriate sportspeople in the Czech Republic
French sportspeople of Ghanaian descent
French footballers
French expatriate sportspeople in the Czech Republic
Ghanaian expatriate footballers
FK Mladá Boleslav players
Expatriate footballers in the Czech Republic
Ghanaian emigrants to France
US Sénart-Moissy players
French expatriate sportspeople in Belgium
R.E. Virton players
F91 Dudelange players
Expatriate footballers in Luxembourg
Footballers from Kumasi
Association football defenders
FC Fribourg players